Massachusetts House of Representatives' 18th Worcester district in the United States is one of 160 legislative districts included in the lower house of the Massachusetts General Court. It covers part of Worcester County. Republican Joseph McKenna of Webster has represented the district since 2015.

Towns represented
The district includes the following localities:
 Douglas
 part of Oxford
 Sutton
 Webster

The current district geographic boundary overlaps with that of the Massachusetts Senate's Worcester and Norfolk district.

Former locales
The district previously covered:
 Brookfield, circa 1872 
 North Brookfield, circa 1872 
 Sturbridge, circa 1872 
 Warren, circa 1872 
 West Brookfield, circa 1872

Representatives
 Henry D. Johnson, circa 1858 
 Charles P. Whitin, circa 1859 
 Peter T. Carroll, circa 1888 
 Carl J. Rolander, circa 1920 
 John M. Shea, circa 1951 
 Richard A. Rogers, circa 1975 
 Jennifer Callahan
 Ryan Fattman
 Joseph D. McKenna, 2015-current

See also
 List of Massachusetts House of Representatives elections
 Other Worcester County districts of the Massachusetts House of Representatives: 1st, 2nd, 3rd, 4th, 5th, 6th, 7th, 8th, 9th, 10th, 11th, 12th, 13th, 14th, 15th, 16th, 17th
 Worcester County districts of the Massachusett Senate: 1st, 2nd; Hampshire, Franklin and Worcester; Middlesex and Worcester; Worcester, Hampden, Hampshire and Middlesex; Worcester and Middlesex; Worcester and Norfolk
 List of Massachusetts General Courts
 List of former districts of the Massachusetts House of Representatives

Images
Portraits of legislators

References

External links
 Ballotpedia
  (State House district information based on U.S. Census Bureau's American Community Survey).
 League of Women Voters of the Worcester Area

House
Government in Worcester County, Massachusetts